The index of physics articles is split into multiple pages due to its size.

To navigate by individual letter use the table of contents below.

A

A. Baha Balantekin
A. Carl Helmholz
A. Catrina Bryce
A. E. Becquerel
A. G. Doroshkevich
A. I. Shlyakhter
A. K. Jonscher
A. P. Balachandran
A15 phases
AAS 215th meeting
ABINIT
ACE (CERN)
ACS Nano
AD1 experiment
AD2 experiment
AD3 experiment
AD4 experiment
AD5 experiment
AD6 experiment
ADA collider
ADHM construction
ADITYA (tokamak)
ADM energy
ADM formalism
ADONE
Advanced Simulation Library
AEGIS (particle physics)
AIDA (computing)
AILU
AIP Conference Proceedings
AKLT Model
ALBA (synchrotron)
ALEPH experiment
ALICE (accelerator)
ALPHA Collaboration
AMBER
AMOLF
ANNNI model
ANTARES (accelerator)
ANTARES (telescope)
APEXC
ARC-ECRIS
ARGUS (experiment)
ARGUS distribution
ARROW waveguide
ASACUSA
ASA Gold Medal
ASA Silver Medal
ASDEX Upgrade
ASTM Subcommittee E20.02 on Radiation Thermometry
ASTRA (reactor)
ASTRID
ASTRID 2
ATHENA
ATLAS Collaboration
ATLAS experiment
ATOMKI
ATRAP
AUSM
A Brief History of Time
A Briefer History of Time (Hawking and Mlodinow book)
A Different Universe
A Dynamical Theory of the Electromagnetic Field
A Large Ion Collider Experiment
A New Theory of Magnetic Storms
A Treatise on Electricity and Magnetism
A Universe from Nothing
A dynamical theory of the electromagnetic field
Aage Bohr
Aaldert Wapstra
Aaron Klug
Aaron Lemonick
Abbe prism
Abbe sine condition
Abdel-Moniem El-Ganayni
Abdul Qadeer Khan
Abdul Rasul (Iraqi scientist)
Abdullah Sadiq
Abdus Salam
Abeles matrix formalism
Abell 520
Aberdeen Tunnel Underground Laboratory
Aberration of light
Abhay Ashtekar
Ablation
Abner Shimony
Abol-fath Khazeni
About Time (book)
Above threshold ionization
Abraham (Avi) Loeb
Abraham Alikhanov
Abraham Bennet
Abraham Esau
Abraham Haskel Taub
Abraham Katzir
Abraham Pais
Abraham Zelmanov
Abraham–Lorentz force
Abraham–Lorentz–Dirac force
Abraham–Minkowski controversy
Abram Ioffe
Abrikosov vortex
Absolute angular momentum
Absolute dating
Absolute horizon
Absolute magnitude
Absolute rotation
Absolute theory
Absolute threshold of hearing
Absolute time and space
Absolute zero
Absorbed dose
Absorber
Absorption (acoustics)
Absorption (electromagnetic radiation)
Absorption band
Absorption cross section
Absorption curve
Absorption edge
Absorption refrigerator
Absorption spectroscopy
Absorption spectrum
Abu'l-Barakāt al-Baghdādī
Abundance of the chemical elements
Accelerated reference frame
Accelerating expansion of the cosmos
Accelerating universe
Acceleration
Acceleration voltage
Accelerator Test Facility (Japan)
Accelerator Test Facility (New York)
Accelerator mass spectrometry
Accelerator physics
Accelerometer
Acceleron
Acceptor (semiconductors)
Acceptor impurity
Accidental symmetry
Accordion effect
Accretion (astrophysics)
Accretion disc
Acentric factor
Achim Richter
Acicular ferrite
Acoplanarity
Acoustic Doppler Current Profiler
Acoustic Doppler velocimetry
Acoustic analogy
Acoustic approximation
Acoustic attenuation
Acoustic cleaning
Acoustic cloak
Acoustic contrast factor
Acoustic dispersion
Acoustic droplet ejection
Acoustic emission
Acoustic holography
Acoustic impedance
Acoustic interferometer
Acoustic levitation
Acoustic location
Acoustic lubrication
Acoustic metamaterials
Acoustic metric
Acoustic microscopy
Acoustic mirror
Acoustic network
Acoustic ohm
Acoustic paramagnetic resonance
Acoustic quieting
Acoustic radiation force
Acoustic radiation force impulse imaging
Acoustic radiation pressure
Acoustic resonance
Acoustic rheometer
Acoustic signature
Acoustic source localization
Acoustic streaming
Acoustic suspension
Acoustic theory
Acoustic wave equation
Acoustical Society of America
Acoustical engineering
Acoustical measurements and instrumentation
Acoustical oceanography
Acoustics
Acousto-optic deflector
Acousto-optics
Acta Biochimica et Biophysica Sinica
Acta Biomaterialia
Acta Crystallographica
Acta Crystallographica A
Acta Crystallographica B
Acta Crystallographica C
Acta Crystallographica D
Acta Crystallographica E
Acta Crystallographica F
Acta Materialia
Acta Physica Polonica
Acta Physica Polonica A
Acta Physica Polonica B
Actinic light
Actinides in the environment
Actinism
Actinometer
Action-angle coordinates
Action (physics)
Action at a distance (physics)
Activation analysis
Activation product
Active acoustics
Active and passive transformation
Active cavity radiometer
Active galactic nucleus
Active laser medium
AdS/CFT correspondence
AdS/QCD
AdS black hole
Ad Lagendijk
Adam Dziewonski
Adam Falk
Adam Riess
Adaptive compliant wing
Adaptive feedback cancellation
Adaptive optics
Added mass
Additive white Gaussian noise
Adelbert Ames, Jr.
Adhémar Jean Claude Barré de Saint-Venant
Adi Bulsara
Adiabatic conductivity
Adiabatic flame temperature
Adiabatic invariant
Adiabatic principle
Adiabatic process
Adiabatic process (quantum mechanics)
Adiabatic shear band
Adiabatic theorem
Adinkra symbols (physics)
Adjustable Ranging Telescope
Adlène Hicheur
Admittance
Adolf Bestelmeyer
Adolf Busemann
Adolf Eugen Fick
Adolf Kratzer
Adolfo Bartoli
Adriaan Fokker
Adrian Bejan
Adrian Berry, 4th Viscount Camrose
Adriano de Paiva
Adrien-Marie Legendre
Advanced Composite Materials (journal)
Advanced Light Source
Advanced Photon Source
Advanced Spaceborne Thermal Emission and Reflection Radiometer
Advanced Thin Ionization Calorimeter
Advanced boiling water reactor
Advanced composite materials (science & engineering)
Advances in Applied Clifford Algebras
Advances in Physics
Advances in Space Research
Advances in Theoretical and Mathematical Physics
Advection
Adverse pressure gradient
Adverse yaw
Ady Stern
Aeolipile
Aeroacoustics
Aerobraking
Aerocapture
Aerodynamic center
Aerodynamic diameter
Aerodynamic drag
Aerodynamic force
Aerodynamic heating
Aerodynamic levitation
Aerodynamic potential flow code
Aerodynamics
Aeroelasticity
Aerogel
Aerographite
Aerogravity assist
Aerology
Aeromechanics
Aeronautics
Aeroprediction
Aerosol
Aerosol impaction
Aerostatics
Aether (classical element)
Aether drag hypothesis
Aether theories
Affleck–Dine mechanism
Afshar experiment
Afterglow plasma
Age crisis
Age of the Earth
Age of the universe
Aggregated diamond nanorod
Agitator (device)
Agnes Pockels
Agrophysics
Aharon Katzir
Aharonov–Bohm effect
Ahmet Yıldız
Aichelburg–Sexl ultraboost
Aileron
Aimé Argand
Aimé Cotton
Air-mixing plenum
Air (classical element)
Air conditioning
Air flow bench
Air knife
Air separation
Air shower (physics)
Air track
Airborne wind turbine
Aircraft dynamic modes
Aircraft flight mechanics
Aircraft noise
Airfoil
Airlift pump
Airy beam
Airy disk
Airy wave theory
Ajoy Ghatak
Akeno Giant Air Shower Array
Akitsune Imamura
Akoustolith
Al-Khazini
Alain Aspect
Alain Haché
Alan Astbury
Alan Boss
Alan West Brewer
Alan Cook
Alan Cottrell
Alan Guth
Alan J. Heeger
Alan Kostelecký
Alan Lightman
Alan Lloyd Hodgkin
Alan M. Portis
Alan Nunn May
Alan Sokal
Alan Tower Waterman
Alan Walsh (physicist)
Alastair G. W. Cameron
Albedo
Albert-László Barabási
Albert Abraham Michelson
Albert Baez
Albert Allen Bartlett
Albert Beaumont Wood
Albert Betz
Albert Bouwers
Albert C. Geyser
Albert Einstein
Albert Einstein: Creator and Rebel
Albert Einstein: The Practical Bohemian
Albert Einstein Award
Albert Einstein Medal
Albert Einstein Science Park
Albert Einstein World Award of Science
Albert Einstein in popular culture
Albert Fert
Albert G. Hill
Albert Messiah
Albert Overhauser
Albert Percival Rowe
Albert Polman
Albert Potter Wills
Albert Rose (physicist)
Albert Sauveur
Albert Tarantola
Albert Victor Bäcklund
Albert von Ettingshausen
Albrecht Fölsing
Albrecht Unsöld
Alcator C-Mod
Alcubierre drive
Aldert van der Ziel
Alec Merrison
Alejandro Corichi
Aleksandar Despić
Aleksandar Just
Aleksander Akhiezer
Aleksander Jabłoński
Aleksander Zawadzki (naturalist)
Aleksandr Andronov
Aleksandr Chudakov
Aleksandr Danilovich Aleksandrov
Aleksandr Gurevich
Aleksandr Leipunskii
Aleksandr Stoletov
Aleksei Pogorelov
Aleksei Zinovyevich Petrov
Alenush Terian
Aleph (CERN)
Alessandra Buonanno
Alessandro Vaciago
Alessandro Vespignani
Alessandro Volta
Alex Grossmann
Alex Smith (engineer)
Alex Stokes
Alex Zettl
Alex Zunger
Alexander's band
Alexander Akimov
Alexander Alexeyevich Makarov
Alexander Anderson (physicist)
Alexander Animalu
Alexander Balankin
Alexander Behm
Alexander Belavin
Alexander Boksenberg
Alexander Dalgarno
Alexander Dallas Bache
Alexander Davydov
Alexander Eugen Conrady
Alexander Fetter
Alexander Friedmann
Alexander Graham Bell
Alexander Hollaender
Alexander Hollaender Award in Biophysics
Alexander Kuzemsky
Alexander MacAulay
Alexander Macfarlane
Alexander Markovich Polyakov
Alexander Meissner
Alexander Mikhajlovich Baldin
Alexander Nikuradse
Alexander Patashinski
Alexander Prokhorov
Alexander R. Hamilton
Alexander Rich
Alexander S. Potupa
Alexander Shikov
Alexander Stepanovich Popov
Alexander Vilenkin
Alexander William Bickerton
Alexander Zamolodchikov
Alexander van Oudenaarden
Alexandre Chorin
Alexandru Marin
Alexandru Proca
Alexei Alexeyevich Abrikosov
Alexei Yuryevich Smirnov
Alexei Zamolodchikov
Alexey Andreevich Anselm
Alexey Kavokin
Alexis-Marie de Rochon
Alexis Clairaut
Alexis Thérèse Petit
Alf Adams
Alfons Bühl
Alfred-Marie Liénard
Alfred Barnard Basset
Alfred Bucherer
Alfred Hubler
Alfred Kastler
Alfred Kleiner
Alfred Landé
Alfred Lauck Parson
Alfred M. Mayer
Alfred O. C. Nier
Alfred Perot
Alfred Robb
Alfred Saupe
Alfred Schild
Alfred Wegener
Alfred Wilm
Alfvén-Klein model
Alfvén wave
Algebra of physical space
Algebraic holography
Algodoo
AliEn (ALICE Environment)
Ali Javan
Ali Moustafa Mosharafa
Alice Leigh-Smith
Alkali-metal thermal to electric converter
All-Union Institute for Scientific and Technical Information
All-silica fiber
All gas-phase iodine laser
Allais effect
Allan Blaer
Allan Boardman
Allan Carswell
Allan Mackintosh
Allan McLeod Cormack
Allan V. Cox
Allen Shenstone
Allyn Vine
Allyne L. Merrill
Aloyzas Sakalas
Alpha-particle spectroscopy
Alpha & Omega (book)
Alpha Magnetic Spectrometer
Alpha decay
Alpha factor
Alpha particle
Alpha process
Alpher–Bethe–Gamow paper
Alternating Gradient Synchrotron
Alternatives to general relativity
Alternatives to the Standard Model Higgs
Aluminium gallium phosphide
Alv Egeland
Alvarez Physics Memo
Alvarez Physics Memos
Alvin Andreas Herborg Nielsen
Alvin C. Graves
Alvin M. Weinberg
Alvin Radkowsky
Alwyn Van der Merwe
Amagat
Amagat's law
Amal Kumar Raychaudhuri
Amasa Stone Bishop
Ambient noise level
Ambient pressure
Ambipolar diffusion
Amer Iqbal
American Association of Physicists in Medicine
American Association of Physics Teachers
American Astron. Soc. 215th Meeting
American Astron. Soc. Meeting
American Astron Soc 215th Meeting
American Astronomical Society
American Astronomical Society 215th meeting
American Geophysical Union
American Institute of Physics
American Journal of Physics
American Physical Society
American Prometheus
American Vacuum Society
Ames Laboratory
Ames trapezoid
Amikam Aharoni
Amir Caldeira
Ammonium diuranate
Ammonium uranyl carbonate
Amorphous ice
Amorphous metal
Amorphous solid
Amory Lovins
Amos Ori
Amos de-Shalit
Amott test
Amount of substance
Ampere
Ampere-turn
Ampere model of magnetization
Amphidromic point
Amplified spontaneous emission
Amplitude
Amplitude damping channel
Ampère's circuital law
Ampère's force law
Amrom Harry Katz
Amsterdam Density Functional
An Album of Fluid Motion
An Elementary Treatise on Electricity
An Essay on the Application of Mathematical Analysis to the Theories of Electricity and Magnetism
An Exceptionally Simple Theory of Everything
An Experimental Enquiry Concerning the Source of the Heat which is Excited by Friction
Ana María Cetto
Anales de Física
Analog Integrated Circuits and Signal Processing
Analog models of gravity
Analysis of flows
Analytical dynamics
Analytical mechanics
Anastigmat
Anatol Roshko
Anatole Abragam
Anatole Boris Volkov
Anatoli Blagonravov
Anatoly Dyatlov
Anatoly Larkin
Anatoly Petrovich Alexandrov
Anatoly Vlasov
Anatoly Zhabotinsky
Anaxagoras
Anaximander
Anders Boserup
Anders Flodström
Anders Johan Lexell
Anders Jonas Ångström
Anders Karlsson (physicist)
Anders Knutsson Ångström
Anderson's rule
Anderson impurity model
Anderson localization
Anderson orthogonality theorem
Andre Geim
Andrea Alù
Andrea M. Ghez
Andrea Naccari
Andrea Prosperetti
Andreas Acrivos
Andreas Albrecht (cosmologist)
Andreas Gerasimos Michalitsianos
Andreas Jaszlinszky
Andreas Mershin
Andreas Winter
Andreas von Ettingshausen
Andreev reflection
Andrei Linde
Andrei Sakharov
Andrej Čadež
Andrew E. Lange
Andrew Gordon (Benedictine)
Andrew Gray (physicist)
Andrew Huxley
Andrew J. Feustel
Andrew Keller
Andrew Lang (physicist)
Andrew Lowe
Andrew Lyne
Andrew R. Liddle
Andrew Steane
Andrew Strominger
Andrew Turberfield
Andrey Kolmogorov
Andreyev Acoustics Institute
Andrija Mohorovičić
Andrius Baltuška
Andromeda–Milky Way collision
Andrzej Kajetan Wróblewski
Andrzej Sołtan
Andrzej Trautman
André-Marie Ampère
André Blondel
André Guinier
André Lichnerowicz
André Maréchal
André Neveu
André Pochan
Anechoic chamber
Aneesur Rahman
Anello Di Accumulazione
Anemometer
Aneutronic fusion
Ángel Rodríguez Lozano
Angelo Battelli
Angioletta Coradini
Angle-resolved photoemission spectroscopy
Angle of attack
Angle of climb
Angle of incidence
Angle of refraction
Angle of repose
Angstrom
Angstrom exponent
Angular Momentum Commutator
Angular acceleration
Angular diameter distance
Angular displacement
Angular frequency
Angular momentum
Angular momentum commutator
Angular momentum coupling
Angular momentum of light
Angular momentum operator
Angular size redshift relation
Angular spectrum method
Angular velocity
Anharmonicity
Anil Bhardwaj
Animal echolocation
Anirudh Singh (activist)
Anisothermal plasma
Anisotropic liquid
Anita Goel
Ann Nelson
Anna Maria Nobili
Annalen der Physik
Annales Henri Poincaré
Annales de chimie et de physique
Annals of Physics
Annealed disorder
Annihilation
Annular dark-field imaging
Annular fin
Annular velocity
Annus Mirabilis papers
Annus mirabilis
Anode ray
Anomalon
Anomalous Diffraction Theory
Anomalous X-ray pulsar
Anomalous cosmic ray
Anomalous diffusion
Anomalous electric dipole moment
Anomalous magnetic dipole moment
Anomalous photovoltaic effect
Anomalous scaling dimension
Anomaly (physics)
Anomaly matching condition
Anosov diffeomorphism
Ansar Pervaiz
Ansatz
Anselmus de Boodt
Antarctic Impulse Transient Antenna
Antarctic Muon And Neutrino Detector Array
Antenn. Wireless Propag. Lett.
Antenn. Wireless Propag. Lett. IEEE
Antenn Wireless Propag Lett, IEEE
Antenna array (electromagnetic)
Antenna noise temperature
Antennas and Wireless Propagation Letters (IEEE)
Anthelion
Anthony E. Siegman
Anthony French
Anthony Ichiro Sanda
Anthony J. DeMaria
Anthony James Leggett
Anthony Kelly (academic)
Anthony M. Johnson
Anthony Zee
Anthropic principle
Anti-gravity
Anti-laser
Anti-phase domain
Anti-reflective coating
Anti-scatter grid
Anti-scratch coating
Anti-shock body
Anti-vibration compound
Anti-de Sitter space
Antibubble
Anticrepuscular rays
Antidynamo theorem
Antiferroelectricity
Antiferromagnetic interaction
Antiferromagnetism
Antigluon
Antihydrogen
Antimatter
Antimatter catalyzed nuclear pulse propulsion
Antimatter comet
Antimatter rocket
Antimatter tests of Lorentz violation
Antimatter weapon
Antimo Palano
Antineutrino
Antineutron
Antinucleon
Antiparticle
Antiphase
Antiphoton
Antiproton
Antiproton Decelerator
Antiprotonic helium
Antiquarian science books
Antistatic agent
Antistatic wrist strap
Antoine César Becquerel
Antoine de Chézy
Anton Ambschel
Anton Kapustin
Anton Maria Schyrleus of Rheita
Anton Oberbeck
Anton Peterlin (physicist)
Anton Zeilinger
Antonia Terzi
Antonie van Leeuwenhoek
Antonino Zichichi
Antonio Ferri
Antonio Pacinotti
Antonio Signorini (physicist)
Antonio Zichichi
Antonius van den Broek
Antony Garrett Lisi
Antony Hewish
Antony Jameson
Antony Valentini
Antun Karlo Bakotić
Anwar Ali (scientist)
Anyon
Ányos Jedlik
Apache Point Observatory Galactic Evolution Experiment
Apache Point Observatory Lunar Laser-ranging Operation
Aperture
Apollo M. O. Smith
Apoorva D. Patel
Apparent horizon
Apparent magnitude
Apparent viscosity
Apparent weight
Appell's equation of motion
Application of tensor theory in physics
Applications of the Stirling engine
Applied Optics
Applied physics
Applied Physics A
Applied Physics B
Applied Physics Express
Applied Physics Letters
Applied Spectroscopy (journal)
Applied Spectroscopy Reviews
Applied mechanics
Applied physics
Applied spectroscopy
Apse line
Apsidal precession
Apsis
ArDM
ArXiv
Arago spot
Arbitrary unit
Arc suppression
Archeops
Archer's paradox
Archibald Hill
Archibald Howie
Archibald Low
Archie G. Worthing
Archimedean point
Archimedes
Archimedes' principle
Archimedes number
Architectural acoustics
Archive for Rational Mechanics and Analysis
Archytas
Arcminute Cosmology Bolometer Array Receiver
Arctowski Medal
Ardeshir Hosseinpour
Area density
Area rule
Areal velocity
Arend Joan Rutgers
Areostationary orbit
Areostationary satellite
Areosynchronous orbit
Areosynchronous satellite
Argo (oceanography)
Argonne Tandem Linear Accelerator System
Argument of periapsis
Argus laser
Arie Andries Kruithof
Arie Bodek
Aristotelian physics
Aristotelian theory of gravity
Aristotle
Arizona Accelerator Mass Spectrometry Laboratory
Arkady Migdal
Arlie Petters
Armand de Waele
Armature reaction drop
Arne Bjerhammar
Arno Allan Penzias
Arnold Eucken
Arnold Flammersfeld
Arnold Kosevich
Arnold Kramish
Arnold Sommerfeld
Arnold diffusion
Arrayed waveguide grating
Arrow of time
Arseny Sokolov
Arthur Ashkin
Arthur B. C. Walker, Jr.
Arthur B. McDonald
Arthur C. Hardy
Arthur Compton
Arthur Covington
Arthur Eddington
Arthur Edward Ruark
Arthur Erich Haas
Arthur F. Turner
Arthur Geoffrey Walker
Arthur Gordon Webster
Arthur H. Rosenfeld
Arthur Iberall
Arthur Jaffe
Arthur Jeffrey Dempster
Arthur Korn
Arthur König
Arthur L. Schawlow Prize in Laser Science
Arthur Leonard Schawlow
Arthur Louis Day
Arthur Maitland
Arthur Morin
Arthur Nowick
Arthur R. von Hippel
Arthur Roberts (physicist)
Arthur S. Lodge
Arthur Schuster
Arthur Scott King
Arthur Stanley Mackenzie
Arthur Stewart Eve
Arthur W. Barton
Arthur Wehnelt
Arthur Wightman
Arthur William Rucker
Arthur Williams Wright
Arthur Zajonc
Arthur von Oettingen
Artificial dielectric
Artificial dielectrics
Artificial disintegration
Artificial gravity
Artificial magnetic conductor
Artificial photosynthesis
Artificial wave
Artur Ekert
Artyom Alikhanian
Arun K. Pati
Arvind Rajaraman
Aryeh Kaplan
Asbestiform
Ascher H. Shapiro
Asher A. Friesem
Asher Peres
Ashesh Prosad Mitra
Ashok Das
Ashoke Sen
Ashtekar variables
Asian African Association for Plasma Training
Askaryan Radio Array
Askaryan effect
Aspect ratio (wing)
Aspera European Astroparticle network
Asperity (materials science)
Aspheric lens
Aspirator (pump)
Associated Legendre polynomials
Association of Los Alamos Scientists
Astatic galvanometer
Asterix IV laser
Asteroseismology
Astigmatism
Astro Space Center (Russia)
Astrochemistry
Astron (fusion reactor)
Astronautics
Astronomia nova
Astronomical seeing
Astronomical spectroscopy
Astronomical system of units
Astronomy
Astronomy & Astrophysics
Astronomy & Geophysics
Astronomy Letters
Astronomy Reports
Astronomy and Astrophysics Decadal Survey
Astronomy and Geophysics
Astroparticle Physics (journal)
Astroparticle physics
Astrophysical X-ray source
Astrophysical plasma
Astrophysics
Astrophysics Data System
Astrophysics Data Systems
Astrophysics and Space Science
Asymptotic freedom
Asymptotic homogenization
Asymptotically flat spacetime
Asım Orhan Barut
Atacama Large Millimeter Array
Ataç İmamoğlu
Athene Donald
Atkinson friction factor
Atkinson resistance
Atmosphere
Atmosphere of Earth
Atmosphere of Titan
Atmosphere of Uranus
Atmospheric-pressure chemical ionization
Atmospheric-pressure plasma
Atmospheric Radiation Measurement
Atmospheric diffraction
Atmospheric duct
Atmospheric ducting
Atmospheric dynamo
Atmospheric electricity
Atmospheric entry
Atmospheric methane
Atmospheric physics
Atmospheric pressure
Atmospheric pressure discharge
Atmospheric radiative transfer codes
Atmospheric refraction
Atmospheric sciences
Atmospheric sounding
Atmospheric stratification
Atmospheric thermodynamics
Atmospheric wave
Atom
Atom: Journey Across the Subatomic Cosmos
Atom laser
Atom optics
Atom probe
Atom vibrations
Atomic, molecular, and optical physics
Atomic Emission Spectrum
Atomic Energy of Canada Limited
Atomic and molecular astrophysics
Atomic battery
Atomic beam
Atomic clock
Atomic coherence
Atomic diffusion
Atomic electron configuration table
Atomic electron transition
Atomic emission spectrum
Atomic force microscopy
Atomic form factor
Atomic fountain
Atomic gas
Atomic line filter
Atomic mass unit
Atomic mirror
Atomic nucleus
Atomic number
Atomic orbital
Atomic orbital model
Atomic packing factor
Atomic percent
Atomic physics
Atomic ratio
Atomic scale
Atomic scales
Atomic spacing
Atomic spectral line
Atomic theory
Atomic units
Atomichron
Atomics International
Atomism
Atomistix Virtual NanoLab
Attenuation
Attenuation (electromagnetic radiation)
Attenuation coefficient
Attenuation length
Attophysics
Attosecond physics
Atwood machine
Atwood number
Audio frequency
Audio power
Aufbau principle
Auger effect
Auger electron spectroscopy
August Beer
August H. Pfund
August Herman Pfund
August Krönig
August Kundt
August Musger
August Seebeck
August Seydler
August Toepler
August Witkowski
Auguste Bravais
Auguste Piccard
Augustin-Jean Fresnel
Augustin-Louis Cauchy
Augusto Righi
Augustus William Smith
Aureole effect
Aurora (astronomy)
Aurora of November 17, 1882
Auroral chorus
Austin Model 1
Australian Atomic Energy Commission
Australian Journal of Physics
Australian Nuclear Science and Technology Organisation
Australian Synchrotron
Autler–Townes effect
Autocollimation
Autocollimator
Autodynamics
Automated Radioxenon Sampler Analyzer
Automatic calculation of particle interaction or decay
Automobile drag coefficient
Autonomous system (mathematics)
Autorotation (helicopter)
Autostereoscopy
Auxetics
Auxiliary field
Auxiliary field Monte Carlo
Available energy (particle collision)
Avalanche breakdown
Avery Gilbert
Avishai Dekel
Avogadro's law
Avrami equation
Avshalom Elitzur
Axel Scherer
Axel T. Brunger
Axial-flow pump
Axial multipole moments
Axial pen force
Axial precession
Axial ratio
Axial tilt
Axiality and rhombicity
Axicon
Axilrod–Teller potential
Axino
Axiomatic quantum field theory
Axion
Azeotrope
Azimuthal quantum number

Indexes of physics articles